Virasia was a town in the west of ancient Pontus, inhabited in Byzantine times. According to the Tabula Peutingeriana it was on the road from Antoniopolis through Anadynata to Amasia, 16 M.P. from the latter.

Its site is located near Doğantepe, Asiatic Turkey.

References

Populated places in ancient Pontus
Former populated places in Turkey
Populated places of the Byzantine Empire
History of Amasya Province